was a Japanese actor, voice actor and narrator who worked for Haikyo (Tokyo Actor's Consumer's Cooperative Society).

Kato was born in Tokyo. He was noted for his role as Megatron and Galvatron from the 1st Transformers series until Transformers: The Headmasters. He also did the ADR for Takeshi Katō's character in Akira Kurosawa's Ran after the original actor had become injured.

He died of bladder cancer at a hospital in Itabashi, Tokyo.

Filmography

Television animation 
Kimba the White Lion (1965) – Totto
Star of the Giants (1968) – Ittetsu Hoshi
Blocker Gundan 4 Machine Blaster (1976) – Professor Genrai Yuri
Chōdenji Machine Voltes V (1977) – Dr. Hamaguchi
Kagaku Ninja-Tai Gatchaman F (1978) – Sosai Z
Fist of the North Star (1984) – Barcom
Star Musketeer Bismark (1984) – Hyuza
Transformers: The Headmasters (1987) – Galvatron
Detective Conan (1996–2014) – Police chief Kiyonaga Matsumoto
Outlaw Star (1998) – Hazanko
Cyborg 009: The Cyborg Soldier (2002) – Gamo Whisky
Ninja Scroll: The Series (2003) – Anden Yamidoro
Gokusen (2004) – Fuji
Shigurui: Death Frenzy (2007) – Kogan Iwamoto
Golgo 13 (2008) (Chief Jerome Knight) (ep. 12)
Fullmetal Alchemist: Brotherhood (2009) – Priest Cornello
Panty & Stocking with Garterbelt (2010) – Minge-atron(Japanese:Mestron) (ep. 7A)
Blade (2011) – Council Chairman (eps. 8, 11)

Original video animation (OVA) 
Vampire Hunter D (1985) – Count Magnus Lee
Transformers: Scramble City (1986) – Megatron
Crying Freeman (1988) – Larry Park
Ronin Warriors (1989) – Shikaisen
Guyver (1989) – Dr. Hamilcar Barcas
Legend of Galactic Heroes (1989) – Viscount Kleingelt
Tenchi Muyo! (1992) – Dr. Clay
Hyper Doll (1995) – Dr. Zaiclit
Gunsmith Cats (1995) – Edward Haints
Fire Emblem (1995) – Jeigan
Z-Mind (1999) – Jim Pekinpah

Animated films 
Ringing Bell (1978) – The Wolf
Doraemon: Nobita's Dinosaur (1980) – Black Mask
Ideon (1982) – Gindoro Jinma
SF New Age Lensman (1984) – Lord Helmuth
Vampire Hunter D (1985) – Lee
The Plot of the Fuma Clan (1987) – Inspector Zenigata
Doraemon: Nobita's Dorabian Nights (1991) – Abdil
Tottoi (1992) – Nanni
Apfelland Monogatari (1992) – General Nolbelt
Crayon Shin-chan: Unkokusai's Ambition (1995) – Unkokusai
Slayers Great (1997) – Galia Einburg
Twilight of the Dark Master (1997) – Takamiya (Male Form)
Tokyo Godfathers (2003) – Mother
Naruto Shippuden the Movie: Bonds (2007) – Môryô
Detective Conan: The Raven Chaser (2009) – Kiyonaga Matsumoto

Video games 
BS Zelda no Densetsu (1995) – Ganon
Everybody's Golf 4 (2003) – Arthur
DreamMix TV World Fighters (2003) – Megatron
Suikoden V (2006) – Gallen, Genoh
Tengai Makyou: Ziria (2006)
LittleBigPlanet 2 (2011) – Dr. Herbert Higginbotham (Japanese Dub)

Live-action films 
Ran (1985) – Koyata Hatakeyama (voice)
Dororo (2007)
Neko Râmen Taishō (2008) – William Thomas Jefferson II (voice)

Live-action television 
Kaze to Kumo to Niji to (1976)
Ōgon no Hibi (1978) – Hosokawa Fujitaka
Tokugawa Ieyasu (1983) – Watanabe Moritsuna

Tokusatsu 
Ultraman (1967) – Alien Mefilas (ep. 22)
Battle Fever J (1979) – Black Mask Monster (ep. 27)
Dengeki Sentai Changeman (1985–1986) – Star King Bazoo (actor by Kazuto Kuwahara)
Hikari Sentai Maskman (1987–1988) – Earth Emperor Zeba
Kamen Rider Black RX (1988–1989) – General Jark (eps. 1 – 44)
Chikyu Sentai Fiveman (1991) – Galactic Super Beast Vulgyre (eps. 46 – 48)
Super Rescue Solbrain (1991–1992) – SolDozer
Kyōryū Sentai Zyuranger (1992–1993) – Great Satan (eps. 30 – 31, 47 – 50) (actor by Ren Urano)
Juukou B-Fighter (1995) – Mercenary Gorgodal (ep. 23)
Gekisou Sentai Carranger (1996) – QQ Kyuutan (ep. 6)
B-Fighter Kabuto (1997) – Darkness Devil Beast Zadan (ep. 44)
Denji Sentai Megaranger vs Carranger (1998) – Helmedor
Seijuu Sentai Gingaman vs Megaranger (1999) – Captain Gregory
Ninpuu Sentai Hurricaneger (2002) – "It"
Kamen Rider 555: Paradise Lost (2003) – Wirepullers of Smart Brain (Actor) (actor of Shōzō Iizuka, Gorō Naya)
Tokusou Sentai Dekaranger (2004) – Detective Chou〈Teranian Chou San〉 (ep. 35)
Ultraman Mebius (2007) – Alien Mefilas (ep. 43 – 47)
Kamen Rider Decade: All Riders vs. Great Shocker (2009) – General Jark
OOO, Den-O, All Riders: Let's Go Kamen Riders (2011) – General Jark

Dubbing roles

Live-action 
Breakheart Pass, Nathan (Ben Johnson)
Captain Scarlet and the Mysterons, Captain Black
Coming to America, Cleo McDowell (John Amos)
Death Warrant, Hawkins (Robert Guillaume)
Divine Secrets of the Ya-Ya Sisterhood, Shepherd James "Shep" Walker (James Garner)
Dune, Gurney Halleck (Patrick Stewart)
For Your Eyes Only, Ernst Stavro Blofeld (Robert Rietti)
The Godfather (1976 NTV edition), Jack Woltz (John Marley)
Gorky Park, Major Pribluda (Rikki Fulton)
Home Alone, Marley (Roberts Blossom)
Nineteen Eighty-Four, Mr. Charrington (Cyril Cusack)
Parenthood (1994 TV Tokyo edition), Frank Buckman (Jason Robards)
The Passage, The Gypsy (Christopher Lee)
Predator (1993 TV Asahi edition), Major General Homer Philips (R. G. Armstrong)
Raw Deal (1991 TV Asahi edition), FBI Agent Harry Shannon (Darren McGavin)
Red Dawn, Colonel Strelnikov (William Smith)
Seven (1999 TV Tokyo/2001 TV Asahi editions), Police Captain (R. Lee Ermey)
Star Trek: Deep Space Nine, Odo (René Auberjonois)
Tron, Master Control Program (David Warner)
Zombi 2 (1982 TBS edition), Dr. David Menard (Richard Johnson)

Animation 
DuckTales – Old Man?
The Jungle Book (1994 Buena Vista edition) – Shere Khan
The Transformers – Megatron, Galvatron, Devastator
The Transformers: The Movie – Megatron, Galvatron
We're Back! A Dinosaur's Story – Professor Screweyes
X-Men (TV Tokyo edition) – Emperor D'Ken

References

External links 
 
 
 

1927 births
2014 deaths
Aoyama Gakuin University alumni
Deaths from bladder cancer
Japanese male stage actors
Japanese male video game actors
Japanese male voice actors
Male voice actors from Tokyo
People from Itabashi
Tokyo Actor's Consumer's Cooperative Society voice actors
20th-century Japanese male actors
21st-century Japanese male actors
Deaths from cancer in Japan